In the study of dynamical systems, a delay embedding theorem gives the conditions under which a chaotic dynamical system can be reconstructed from a sequence of observations of the state of a dynamical system. The reconstruction preserves the properties of the dynamical system that do not change under smooth coordinate changes (i.e., diffeomorphisms), but it does not preserve the geometric shape of structures in phase space.

Takens' theorem is the 1981 delay embedding theorem of Floris Takens. It provides the conditions under which a smooth attractor can be reconstructed from the observations made with a generic function. Later results replaced the smooth attractor with a set of arbitrary box counting dimension and the class of generic functions with other classes of functions.

Delay embedding theorems are simpler to state for
discrete-time dynamical systems.
The state space of the dynamical system is a -dimensional manifold . The dynamics is given by a smooth map

Assume that the dynamics  has a strange attractor  with box counting dimension .  Using ideas from Whitney's embedding theorem,  can be embedded in -dimensional Euclidean space with

That is, there is a diffeomorphism  that maps  into  such that the derivative of  has full rank.

A delay embedding theorem uses an observation function to construct the embedding function.  An observation function  must be twice-differentiable and associate a real number to any point of the attractor . It must also be typical, so its derivative is of full rank and has no special symmetries in its components. The delay embedding theorem states that the function

Simplified, slightly inaccurate version

Suppose the -dimensional 
state vector  evolves according to an unknown but continuous
and (crucially) deterministic dynamic. Suppose, too, that the
Now at any time we can look not just at
the present measurement , but also at observations made at times
removed from us by multiples of some lag , etc. If we use
 lags, we have a -dimensional vector. One might expect that, as the
number of lags is increased, the motion in the lagged space will become
more and more predictable, and perhaps in the limit  would become
deterministic. In fact, the dynamics of the lagged vectors become
deterministic at a finite dimension; not only that, but the deterministic
dynamics are completely equivalent to those of the original state space (More exactly, they are related by a smooth, invertible change of coordinates,
or diffeomorphism.) The magic embedding dimension  is
at most , and often less.

See also 

 Whitney embedding theorem
 Nonlinear dimensionality reduction

References

Further reading

External links
 Attractor Reconstruction (scholarpedia)
  Scientio's ChaosKit product uses embedding to create analyses and predictions. Access is provided online via a web service and graphic interface.

Theorems in dynamical systems